Josef is the surname of the following people:
Jens Josef (born 1967), German composer of classical music, a flutist and academic teacher
Michelle Josef (born 1954), Canadian musician and transgender activist
Mikolas Josef (born 1995), Czech singer-songwriter, music producer and choreographer 
Waldemar Josef (born 1960), German footballer

Surnames from given names